The southern rough-winged swallow (Stelgidopteryx ruficollis) is a small swallow. It was first formally described as Hirundo ruficollis by French ornithologist Louis Vieillot in 1817 in his Nouveau Dictionnaire d'Histoire Naturelle.

Morphology 
It is brown above, with blackish wings and tail and a pale grey rump. The throat and upper breast are rufous with the lower underparts yellowish-white. The tail is slightly forked. It is similar in appearance to its northern counterpart, the northern rough-winged swallow, but is more uniform in color, particularly on the rump.

"Rough-winged" refers to the serrated edge of the outer primary feathers on the wing of this bird; this feature would only be apparent when holding this bird.

Distribution 
It occurs in Central and South America from Honduras south to northern Argentina and Uruguay. It also occurs on Trinidad. Southern birds of the nominate race S. r. ruficollis, are migratory, moving north in winter, but the northern S. r. aequalis is sedentary.

Ecology 
It is found in open areas and forest clearings. It nests in grass-lined cavities of various types, including holes in banks or walls, or disused kingfisher and jacamar nests. It does not form colonies. The clutch is 3–6 white eggs, incubated by the female for 16–18 days and with another 13 days to fledging. Southern rough-winged swallows forage for insects (such as plant bugs, beetles, flies, flying ants and heteropterans) in flight, usually flying low with a slow deliberate flight. The call is an unmusical chirrup.

References

Further reading

External links 

 
 
 
 

southern rough-winged swallow
Birds of Costa Rica
Birds of Honduras
Birds of Nicaragua
Birds of Panama
Birds of South America
Birds of the Guianas
Birds of the Amazon Basin
Birds of Trinidad and Tobago
Birds of islands of the Atlantic Ocean
southern rough-winged swallow
southern rough-winged swallow